Luxembourg was represented by the group Park Café, with the song "Monsieur", at the 1989 Eurovision Song Contest, which took place on 6 May in Lausanne, Switzerland. For the first time since 1978 (and only the third time ever), broadcaster RTL organised a public national final rather than their usual method of internal selection.

Before Eurovision

National final 
The national final was held on 5 March at the RTL studios, hosted by Jean Octave and Manette Dupong. Park Café performed three songs with the winner chosen by a public televote.

Park Café consisted of a six-piece band fronted by American singer Maggie Parke, and members Gast Waltzing, Rom Heck, Rainer Kind, Serge Vesque and Ander Schmit, with the winning song "Monsieur" written by Parke, Yves Lacomblez and Bernard Loncheval, and composed by Parke and Gast Waltzing.

At Eurovision 
Park Café performed 11th in the running order, following  and preceding , and conducted by Benoît Kaufman. At the close of voting "Monsieur" had received 8 points, placing Luxembourg 20th of the 22 entries. The Luxembourgian jury awarded its 12 points to the United Kingdom.

It was succeeded as Luxembourgish entry in the 1990 contest by Céline Carzo with "Quand je te rêve".

Voting

References

External links
 Official Eurovision Song Contest site, history by year, 1989
 Detailed info & lyrics, The Diggiloo Thrush, "Monsieur".

1989
Countries in the Eurovision Song Contest 1989
Eurovision